"Discovery" is Japanese voice actor Mamoru Miyano's second single, released on June 4, 2008. It had peaked at #24 on the Oricon charts. The title track was used as the ending for the PlayStation 2 game Fushigi Yugi Suzaku Ibun.

Track listing

2008 singles
J-pop songs
2008 songs
King Records (Japan) singles